During the 1996–97 season 'Atalanta Bergamasca Calcio competed in Serie A and Coppa Italia.

Summary 

The squad finished in a decent 1996-97 Serie A campaign in middle of the League table, with Filippo Inzaghi became topscorer with 24 goals in 33 matches defeating Sampdoria striker Vincenzo Montella in an exciting race. 
Inzaghi tied Platini record 1983-84 Serie A scoring to 15 different teams in a tournament.  Also, goalkeeper Davide Pinato reached a new club record: 757 minutes without conceding a goal.

On 12 February 1997 Federico Pisani, died in a car accident with his BMW 320 convertible in the company of his girlfriend Alessandra Midali (who also died in the accident) and two friends (who were uninjured): number 14 is retired in his honour, and renamed the North section (curv) of Stadio Atleti Azzurri d'Italia.

Squad

Transfers

Winter

Competitions

Serie A

League table

Position by round

Matches

Coppa Italia

First round

Statistics

Squad Statistics

Players statistics

References

Bibliography

External links 
 

Atalanta B.C. seasons
Atalanta